Bobby Goldsmith Foundation (BGF) is an Australian HIV charity based in Sydney, New South Wales. It aims to provide practical, emotional and financial assistance to people living with HIV and currently operates in New South Wales and Adelaide. It was formed in July 1984 from a trust fund organised after the death of Bobby Goldsmith, who was the first person in New South Wales to be publicly recognised as having died of AIDS-related illness.  It is one of Australia's oldest HIV charities.

History 
Shortly after its formation, BGF became a founding member of the New South Wales AIDS Action Committee. In 1985, BGF assisted in funding the AIDS Council of New South Wales's 'Rubba Me' safe sex campaign after the NSW Government withdrew its support.

As of 2018, BGF offered one of two HIV self-management programs in Australia.

Former High Court Justice Michael Kirby has been BGF's patron since 2002 and journalist Ita Buttrose is a life member. In 2020, former bobsledder and rugby union player Simon Dunn was announced as an ambassador for BGF.

BGF is currently an affiliate member of the Australian Federation of AIDS Organisations, the National Association of People With HIV Australia and the Australasian Society for HIV, Viral Hepatitis and Sexual Health Medicine.

See also 
 HIV/AIDS in Australia

References

External links 
 Bobby Goldsmith Foundation website

HIV/AIDS in Australia
HIV/AIDS organizations
Charities based in Australia
Health charities in Australia
1984 establishments in Australia
Medical and health organisations based in New South Wales